Classification theory may refer to:
For the practice and science of classification  see Taxonomy and Library science
For the science of finding, describing and categorising organisms see alpha taxonomy
For classification theory in biology see Biological classification
For classification theory in mathematical model theory see stable theory